Birdman and the Galaxy Trio, or simply Birdman or The Galaxy Trio, is an American animated television series by Hanna-Barbera Productions that debuted on NBC on September 9, 1967, and ran on Saturday mornings until September 6, 1969. The program consists of two segments: Birdman, depicting the adventures of a winged superhero (created by Alex Toth, creator of Space Ghost) powered by the sun, and The Galaxy Trio, centered around the adventures of a patrol of interstellar superheroes. Each segment was a complete independent story, and the characters of each segment did not interact with those of the other, except for a bumper that has all four heroes defeating a prehistoric monster.

A sequel series, Harvey Birdman, Attorney at Law, premiered on Adult Swim on September 2, 2001, concluding on July 22, 2007 after four seasons, with a special, Harvey Birdman: Attorney General, premiering on October 15, 2018, and a spin-off series, Birdgirl, premiering on April 5, 2021.

Segments

Birdman
Birdman (voiced by Keith Andes) is an ordinary human who has been endowed by the sun god Ra with the ability to shoot solar rays from his fists and project quasi-solid "solar shields" to defend himself against attacks (Birdman's origin is only vaguely, and only briefly, hinted at during the series. His real name is there given as Raymond "Ray" Randall). After he had acquired his avian—and other—powers, he was recruited by a top-secret government agency, Inter-Nation Security, and now works full-time fighting crime, assisted by his pet eagle, who responds to the name of Avenger. In addition to the abilities he received from Ra, Birdman also possesses the power of flight, thanks to the giant wings which sprout from his back. It is possible Birdman is fireproof; being forced into an incinerator recharged rather than hurt him. His sole weakness is that he has to recharge his superhuman powers periodically, through exposure either to the sun's rays or to a comparable source of heat and/or light such as a desk lamp (when he was once shrunken to insect proportions) or the aforementioned incinerator, a weakness that is exposed in nearly every episode. His trademark is his battle cry of "Biiiiirdman!!!" whenever he goes into battle.

He is assisted by his supporting characters:

 Falcon 7 (voiced by Don Messick) – Birdman's eye patch-wearing contact with Inter-Nation Security, and the person from whom Birdman typically receives his missions.
 Birdboy (voiced by Dick Beals) – A sidekick for Birdman. The two first met when Birdman happened upon a shipwreck, of which Birdboy was the only apparent survivor. Since the boy was near death from exposure, Birdman transferred some of his own super energy to him, reviving him and giving powers similar to Birdman's, and he went on to aid him in several episodes. Birdboy lacks the natural feathered wings sported by Birdman, however, and is only able to fly with the assistance of the mechanical wings strapped to his back. He spends much of his time searching for his father, who was lost in the wreck, but this is never resolved.
 General Stone (voiced by Don Messick) – General Stone appears several times in Birdman with other military leaders, and tends to find himself on the receiving end of the villains' schemes.

Birdman has fought the sinister organization F.E.A.R. that is led by Number One (voiced by John Stephenson) and Birdman's "number one" enemy. F.E.A.R. is behind many plots over the course of the series, frequently employing supervillains to perform nefarious tasks. The organization was seemingly defeated for good and its leader arrested in "The Wings of F.E.A.R.", but it occasionally resurfaced without any explanation.

Birdman has also fought some other villains with some of them appearing either having one appearance or having more than one appearance. They consist of:

 Dr. Millennium (voiced by Hal Smith) - A supervillain who appeared in "The Menace of Dr. Millennium", using a time-manipulating machine to commit crimes. He returned in "The Revenge of Dr. Millennium" where he tried to exact his revenge on Birdman and take over the world from the past.
 X the Eliminator (voiced by John Stephenson) - A mercenary hired by F.E.A.R. to eliminate Birdman. He is charged with bringing back Birdman's crest from his helmet as proof of his accomplishment.
 The Ruthless Ringmaster (voiced by Vic Perrin) - An agent of F.E.A.R.
 Morto the Marauder - A criminal genius and evidently once a significant threat to the world, Morto twice escaped from prison with his mechanical know-how and wreaked havoc in "Morto the Marauder" and "Morto Rides Again".
 Cumulus the Storm King (voiced by Henry Corden) - A supervillain who can control the weather.
 Nitron the Human Bomb - A scientist who got the capabilities and powers of a chemical called NITRON. He is eager to join F.E.A.R, for which Number One tells him to finish the atomic reactor USS-CO-BOLT and Birdman, but fails.
 The Mummer - A supervillain who is a master of disguise. Unlike most of Birdman's enemies, the Mummer was able to escape from him thanks to his disguises making him one of a few villains to get away.
 Kiroff - A supervillain who was responsible for causing worldwide earthquakes.
 Zardo - A supervillain who at one time captured Avenger. He received a complete redesign in Harvey Birdman, Attorney at Law.
 The Constrictor - Dressed like a snake and has two boa constrictors as his pets, this supervillain captures Avenger and tries to use him in order to capture Birdman. Birdman finds Avenger and burns Constrictor's headquarters down. Constrictor realizes Birdman is too powerful to be defeated and manages to escape, Birdman never caught the Constrictor making him one of a few villains to get away.
 Reducto (voiced by John Stephenson): A supervillain who wields a shrink ray. He uses this ray to demand money from Central City or he will shrink it. After being defeated by Birdman, he is shrunken down to microscopic size.
 Doctor Shark - A supervillain who fought Birdman underwater and had the face of a shark, but the body of a man. Birdman had to constantly regain his strength by battling Doctor Shark in small increments so that he did not lose his energy from being away from the sun. Doctor Shark was eventually defeated.
 Hannibal the Hunter - A big game hunter who is determined to hunt down Birdman.
 Mentor the Mind-Taker (voiced by Don Messick) - Mentor has the ability to send cerebral messages to a person or animal to do his bidding. He uses this ability to get Birdman to steal missiles from the United States government. He plans on using these missiles to start a war between two countries. He was renamed Mentok when he appeared in Harvey Birdman, Attorney at Law. The name change was also carried over to the Hanna-Barbera Beyond comics.
 Dr. Freezoid - Dr. Freezoid has a weapon that can turn an entire city block into ice. He has a retreat at the North Pole. Birdman causes him to self-destruct his base of operations with his own weapons trapping Dr. Freezoid inside.
 The Duplicator (voiced by Frank Gerstle) - An old man with large glasses, the Deadly Duplicator uses his glasses to create duplicates of the people that he zaps. The Deadly Duplicator has full control over the twin and uses them to help him in his plans to take over the world, but of course is thwarted by Birdman.
 Professor Nightshade - An agent of F.E.A.R., he steals a solar box that has the power to send entire cities into the fourth dimension. Professor Nightshade traps Birdman and tries to use the solar box on him, but it reacts to Birdman differently: instead of sending Birdman into the fourth dimension, it gives him energy to become strong. When Prof. Nightshade tries to use it again on him, it reflects off of Birdman and Nightshade accidentally sends himself into the fourth dimension. Birdman then destroys the machine.
 The Chameleon - A scientist who created a transformation serum that gave him the ability to shapeshift into whatever he wants, whether it's people, animals, or even inanimate objects. In the end, the serum in his body ran out and Birdman handed him over the police.
 Captain Moray of the Deep - Captain Moray abducts his seventh scientist. He forces them to develop a nuclear reactor. Birdman disguises himself as a scientist and gets abducted by Moray, but Moray knew it was him and a great battle ensues. Birdman is then captured for real. He sends a signal to Birdboy to find him. As Birdman is about to enter a nuclear reactor (which should have killed him), his energy is instead restored enabling him to end the villainy of Captain Moray as Birdman hands him over to the Navy.
 The Aliens of the Purple Moss - These were aliens who came to Earth to take it over. Fortunately, Birdman was informed and stopped the aliens in a heated battle.
 The Brain Thief (voiced by Don Messick) - A mad scientist named Doctor Shado captures four other scientists and tries to steal the information in their minds.
 Dr. Mentaur - A scientist who turned a woman into Birdgirl through hypnosis, a super serum, and some metal wings. Eventually, he was defeated and Birdgirl became normal again.
 Birdgirl - Created by Dr. Mentaur through hypnosis, a super serum and some metal wings. She was an aerialist before she met Dr. Mentaur. While under hypnosis, she was used to defeat Birdman. While captured, Birdman tricked her into letting him go outside as a last request. Regaining his strength from the sun, this allowed Birdman to defeat Dr. Mentaur and save Birdgirl.
 The Magnatroid - This was a robot created by a scientist to destroy Birdman.
 Medusa (voiced by June Foray) a.k.a. "the Empress of Evil" - Medusa captures the Prince of the Maja Raja and then captures Birdman. The Prince gives Birdman a diamond from his turban that he says came from the sun god, Ra. After giving it to Birdman, Birdman is able to regain his strength and defeat Medusa. She throws herself into a pit of demons to elude him.
 Spyro - Head of a master spy syndicate, he hijacked the atomic city supply train to do some evil bidding.
 Dr. Claw - A scientist that used an ant serum to inject into his creation, the Ant Ape. When he injects his robot creation, the Ant Ape becomes super-strong and nearly unstoppable, but Birdman defeats them.
 The Speed Demon - A convicted felon already put away by Birdman retaliates by creating a potion that gives him super-speed. He runs around stealing money and jewels from various places. He then realizes that with his new power, he cannot be defeated. Speed Demon captures Birdman and almost defeats him, but Birman comes out on top. In the end, Speed Demon's speed causes his aging process to speed up rapidly while evading a missile and he becomes an old man, losing the battle.
 Vulturo (voiced by Don Messick) - Dr. Vult is an evil scientist who made a vulture-like costume to combat Birdman. He first appeared in "Vulturo, Prince of Darkness" where he was hired by F.E.A.R. to destroy Birdman. In "The Return of Vulturo", Vulturo tried to exact his revenge that involved kidnapping Birdboy.
 The Barracuda - A supervillain who plans on using torpedoes and submarines to loot ships and to start wars between countries.
 Murro (sic) the Marauder: This evil villain can commandeer the shadows of unsuspecting victims. Although the episode title card identifies the character as Murro, he is referred to "Murko" throughout the segment.

Galaxy Trio
The Galaxy Trio is a group of three extraterrestrial superheroes, Vapor Man, Meteor Man, and Gravity Girl, who patrol space in their cruiser Condor One maintaining order and fighting evildoers in the name of the Galactic Patrol law enforcement agency. The ship was equipped with a "displacer", that is, a teleportation device.

 Vapor Man (voiced by Don Messick) – He has the ability to transform part or all of his body into gaseous form (a power shared by at least some residents of his home planet of Vaporus), enabling him to fly, escape from physical bonds, and squeeze through very small spaces, as well as producing various forms of "vapor" (such as "freeze vapor") from his hands.
 Meteor Man (voiced by Ted Cassidy) – A native of the planet Meteorus. Meteor Man is distinguished by his ability to increase or decrease the size of any part of his body. He gains superhuman strength in any limb that he chooses to enlarge.
 Gravity Girl (voiced by Virginia Eiler) – She has the ability to bend the laws of gravity to her will, allowing her to fly and lift very heavy objects with her mind. The daughter of the king of the planet Gravitas, she left her luxurious home and life of privilege at an early age to fight crime with the Galactic Patrol and was subsequently assigned to the Galaxy Trio team, with whom she has served ever since.

The Galaxy Trio get their missions from a man named the Chief.

The Galaxy Trio faces off against an assortment of villains with some of them appearing more than one:

 Computron - A robot from Orbus 4 that plotted to take control of it.
 Lotar - The twin brother of Neptar on the planet Aqueus who conspires to take his brother's throne.

Episodes
Each episode featured two Birdman segments with one Galaxy Trio segment between them.

In other media

Birdman appeared in issues 1 through 7 (April 1968 – October 1969) of the Hanna-Barbera Super TV Heroes comic book, published by Gold Key Comics. He was joined in issue 2 by the Galaxy Trio (their first appearance together).

In 1997, he was also featured in issue #5 of DC Comics' Cartoon Network Presents: Toonami comic book series.

In 2000, the character of Birdman was revived three decades later in the parody Cartoon Network/Adult Swim TV series Harvey Birdman, Attorney at Law, and several characters from Birdman and the Galaxy Trio appeared in this satire.

In 2008, actor Vijay depicted Indian Birdman in multiverse with flying abilities in Kuruvi, and his pet eagle was shown in the film.

In 2016, Birdman and the Galaxy Trio played a major role in the DC Comics series Future Quest, that also featured characters from various animated series produced by Hanna-Barbera such as Jonny Quest, Space Ghost, The Herculoids, Frankenstein Jr. and The Impossibles, and Moby Dick and Mighty Mightor.

By 2021, Gravity Girl makes a cameo in Jellystone! She was seen in Mayor Huckleberry Hound's flashback as the referee of the infamous final fight of The Funky Phantom where she pulled him out of the ring after he misused his ghostly abilities on Mightor.

Home media
On July 17, 2007, Warner Home Video released Birdman and the Galaxy Trio: The Complete Series on DVD in Region 1. This DVD set was re-released by the company's Warner Archive division as a manufacture-on-demand (MOD) release on January 10, 2017. Birdman also accidentally appeared on the menu screen for the DC Super Heroes: The Filmation Adventures, a DVD set which featured DC Comics-based superhero cartoons produced by Filmation for The Superman/Aquaman Hour of Adventure (which coincidentally premiered the same day as Birdman and the Galaxy Trio), in 2008. Warner Home Video has stated that this was a mistake, and that Hawkman was supposed to be in Birdman's place.

In other languages
 
 Japanese: 電子鳥人Ｕバード/銀河トリオ (Denshi Chōjin Yū-Bādo / Ginga Torio; "Electronic Superhuman U-Bird / Galaxy Trio")

See also
List of Hanna-Barbera characters
List of works produced by Hanna-Barbera Productions

References

External links
 
 Birdman and the Galaxy Trio at HBShows.com
 The Birdman FAQ
 The Galaxy Trio at Don Markstein's Toonopedia. Archived from the original on July 31, 2016.

1967 American television series debuts
1968 American television series endings
American children's animated action television series
American children's animated space adventure television series
American children's animated science fantasy television series
American children's animated superhero television series
Television series by Hanna-Barbera
Television series set on fictional planets
NBC original programming
1960s American animated television series
Hanna-Barbera superheroes
DC Comics superheroes
Galaxy Trio
English-language television shows